Bonneval is an unincorporated community in the town of Armstrong Creek, Forest County, Wisconsin, United States.

References

Unincorporated communities in Forest County, Wisconsin
Unincorporated communities in Wisconsin